Banks Board Bureau (BBB) is an autonomous body of the Government of India tasked to Search and Select apposite personages for Board of Public Sector Banks, Public Sector Financial Institutions and Public Sector Insurance Companies and recommend measures to improve Corporate Governance in these Institutions. The mandate of the Bureau includes

 To recommend the selection and appointment of Board of Directors in Nationalised Banks, Financial Institutions and Public Sector Insurance Companies (Whole Time Directors and Chairman);
 To advise the Central Government on matters relating to appointments, confirmation or extension of tenure and termination of services of the Directors of mandated institutions;
 To advise the Central Government on the desired management structure of mandated institutions, at the level of Board of Directors and senior management;
 To advise the Central Government on a suitable performance appraisal system for mandated institutions;
 To build a data bank containing data relating to the performance of mandated institutions and its officers;
 To advise the Central Government on the formulation and enforcement of a code of conduct and ethics for managerial personnel in mandated institutions.
 To advise the Central Government on evolving suitable training and development programs for managerial personnel in mandated institutions
 To help the banks in terms of developing business strategies and capital raising plan and the like;
 Any other work assigned by the Government in consultation with Reserve Bank of India.

Central Government notified the amendment to the Nationalised Banks (Management and Miscellaneous Provisions) Scheme, 1980 providing the legal framework for composition and functions of the Banks Board Bureau on March 23, 2016. The Bureau accordingly started functioning from April 01, 2016 as an autonomous recommendatory body. 

The BBB works as step towards governance reforms in Public Sector Banks (PSBs) as recommended by P.J. Nayak Committee.

Bhanu Pratap Sharma is the Chairman of the Mumbai based Banks Board Bureau (Since 2018). It is housed in RBI's Byculla Office in Mumbai.

The first Chairman of Banks Board Bureau was Shri Vinod Rai (2016-2018).

The Banks Board Bureau website is https://banksboardbureau.org.in and its official Twitter Handle is @BanksBoardBuro

References

External links

Financial services companies based in Mumbai
India
Regulatory agencies of India
Banking in India
Modi administration initiatives
2016 establishments in India
Government agencies established in 2016